Philosophy Now is a bimonthly philosophy magazine sold from news-stands and book stores in the United States, United Kingdom, Australia, and Canada; it is also available on digital devices, and online. It aims to appeal to the wider public, as well as to students and philosophy teachers. It was established in 1991 and was the first general philosophy magazine.

History
Philosophy Now was established in May 1991 as a quarterly magazine by Rick Lewis. The first issue included an article on free will by then atheist philosopher Antony Flew, who remained an occasional contributor for many years.

The magazine was initially published in Lewis' home town of Ipswich (England). Peter Rickman soon became one of the most regular contributors. In 1997, a group of American philosophers including Raymond Pfeiffer and Charles Echelbarger lobbied the American Philosophical Association to start a similar magazine in the United States. The then APA executive director Eric Hoffman arranged a meeting in Philadelphia in 1997, to which Lewis was invited. At the meeting, it was decided that the American group should join forces with Lewis to further develop Philosophy Now. Since that time, the magazine has been produced jointly by two editorial boards, in the UK and US. The magazine is distributed in the US by the Philosophy Documentation Center.

In 2000 Philosophy Now increased its frequency to appear bimonthly. Lewis is now the Editor in Chief, while Grant Bartley is Editor of the print edition and Bora Dogan edits the digital editions.

Philosophy Now won the Bertrand Russell Society Award for 2016.

Contents
The magazine contains articles on most areas of philosophy. Most are written by academics, though some are by postgraduate students or by independent writers. Although it aims at a non-specialist audience, Philosophy Now has frequently attracted articles by well-known thinkers.

Philosophy Now also regularly features book reviews, interviews, fiction, a film column, cartoons, and readers' letters. Its regular columnists include Raymond Tallis (Tallis in Wonderland) and Peter Adamson (Philosophy Then). For some years there was a philosophical agony-aunt column called Dear Socrates, allegedly written by a reincarnation of the Athenian sage. The magazine's contents are discussed in an online discussion forum.

Scoops and controversies
The philosophy Professor Antony Flew, noted for his arguments in favour of atheism, published a letter in Philosophy Now'''s August/September 2004 issue in which he first indicated that his position regarding God's existence had changed. The news of Flew's change-of-mind was carried in many newspapers worldwide, most of them referencing Flew's Philosophy Now letter.

A Philosophy Now interview with the Canadian philosopher Charles Taylor in 2009 created controversy in Canadian newspapers because of Taylor's dismissive remarks about an atheist poster campaign on buses.

 Abstracting and indexing 
The magazine is abstracted and indexed in:
 British Humanities Index International Bibliography of Periodical Literature (IBZ)

 Philosophy Now Festival 

In 2011, the magazine organised a philosophy festival for the general public. The venue was Conway Hall in central London. Since then the Philosophy Now Festival has become a regular biannual event. The second Philosophy Now Festival was held in 2013, the third in 2015 and the fourth in January 2018. Each festival was a one-day event involving contributions from a large number of philosophy organisations including Philosophy For All and the Royal Institute of Philosophy. The next festival will be held on 18 January 2020.

 Against Stupidity Award 
Also in 2011, the magazine launched an annual award, the Philosophy Now Award for Contributions in the Fight Against Stupidity. The first winner was the philosopher Mary Midgley. Each year since, there has been an award ceremony at Conway Hall, including an acceptance speech. In 2011, 2013, 2015 and 2018 this was part of the Philosophy Now Festival.

In October 2015 Philosophy Now announced that the 2015 Award would for the first time be given to a children's author, Cressida Cowell. The full list of winners is:

 2011:  Mary Midgley
 2012:  Ben Goldacre
 2013:  Raymond Tallis
 2014:  Noam Chomsky
 2015:  Cressida Cowell
 2016:  Peter Singer
 2017:  James Randi
 2018:  Robert Sapolsky
 2019:  Angela Phillips
 2020:  Jon Ronson

See also
 Newton's flaming laser sword
 The Death of Postmodernism and Beyond''
 Think
 Café Philosophique

References

External links
 

1991 establishments in England
Bi-monthly magazines published in the United Kingdom
English-language magazines
Magazines established in 1991
Magazines published in London
Philosophy magazines
Philosophy Documentation Center academic journals
Public philosophy